Karaj County is in Alborz province, Iran. The capital of the county is the city of Karaj. At the 2006 census, when it was a county in Tehran province, its population was 1,709,481 in 472,365 households. At the 2016 census, the county's population was 1,973,470 in 623,801 households, by which time it had become a part of recently established Alborz province.

Administrative divisions

The population history and structural changes of Karaj County's administrative divisions over two censuses are shown in the following table. The latest census shows two districts, six rural districts, and six cities.

Gallery

References 

Karaj County

Counties of Alborz Province